Shorea xanthophylla (also called seraya kuning barun or lun barun) is a species of plant in the family Dipterocarpaceae. The name xanthophylla is derived from Greek, xanthos = yellow, phullon = leaf and refers to the yellowish colour of the dried leaf. The timber is sold under the trade name of yellow meranti.

It is endemic to Borneo.

References

xanthophylla
Endemic flora of Borneo
Trees of Borneo
Taxonomy articles created by Polbot